Sukhonsky is a rural locality (a settlement) in Opokskoye Rural Settlement, Velikoustyugsky District, Vologda Oblast, Russia. The population was 172 as of 2002. There are 6 streets.

Geography 
Sukhonsky is located 120 km southwest of Veliky Ustyug (the district's administrative centre) by road. Poldarsa is the nearest rural locality.

References 

Rural localities in Velikoustyugsky District